Julio Cesar Neves Jr. (born 25 April 1994) is a Brazilian mixed martial artist who has most notably competed in the featherweight division of Bellator MMA.

Background
Julio Cesar was born in Brazil. He achieved a coveted 30-0 record after defeating Poppies Martinez at Bellator 125, an unheard of accomplishment in mixed martial arts competition, given his age and the time span in which he competed.

Mixed martial arts career

Early career
Neves had been competing in the Brazilian circuit since late-2011, amassing 28 bouts and early finishes in a very condensed period of time before signing with Bellator MMA. He was doing so at a very young age, being only 19-years-old when he was signed to Bellator. He was expected to face Yuri Maia at Golden Fighters 7 on 9 November 2013, but it was cancelled because of the subsequent signing to Bellator.

Bellator MMA
Neves made his Bellator debut on 18 April 2014 (just days before his 20th birthday) at Bellator 117 against Josh Arocho. The 19-year-old was successful in his debut, defeating Arocho in the second round via TKO.

In his second bout with the promotion, Neves faced Poppies Martinez on 19 September 2014 at Bellator 125. He won via TKO in the first round.

In his third bout with the promotion, Neves faced fellow up-and-comer Jordan Parsons at Bellator 137 on 15 May 2015. He lost the back and forth fight via submission in the third round. This marked the first professional defeat of his career.

In June 2015, it was revealed that Neves, along with his brother Rafael Silva, were among 8 fighters released from the promotion.

Criticism

Neves' record has been subject of controversy in his home country of Brazil. According to many local MMA resources and forums, Neves built his undefeated record facing mostly "cans" and opponents with irregular MMA records while avoiding tougher challengers. Some of his opponents' records, in order, are: 0-3, 0-2, 3-2, 0-2, 9-8, 4-3, 0-1, 2-3, 1-3, 1-1, 0-3, 1-7, 1-1, 0-2, 12-10 and 0-2.

Mixed martial arts record

|Win
|align=center|35–1
| Kevin Park
|Decision (unanimous)
|Battlefield FC 2
|
|align=center|3
|align=center|5:00
|Macau, China
|
|-
|Win
|align=center|34–1
|Roger Sampaio
|Submission (guillotine choke)
|Aspera FC 57
|
|align=center|1
|align=center|1:14
| Florianópolis,  Santa Catarina, Brazil
|
|-
|Win
|align=center|33–1
| Fernando Colman
|Decision (unanimous)
|Brave CF 4
|
|align=center|3
|align=center|5:00
|Parana, Brazil
|Catchweight 150 pounds
|-
|Win
|align=center|32–1
| Carlisson Diego Santos
|Submission (anaconda choke)
|Smash Fight 4
|
|align=center|2
|align=center|4:08
|Curitiba, Parana, Brazil
|
|-
|Win
|align=center|31–1
| Ranieri Zenidim
|Decision (unanimous)
|Aspera FC 40
|
|align=center|3
|align=center|5:00
|Santa Catarina, Brazil
|
|-
|Loss
|align=center|30–1
| Jordan Parsons
|Submission (arm-triangle choke)
|Bellator 137
|
|align=center|3
|align=center|4:09
|Temecula, California, United States
|
|-
|Win
|align=center|30–0
|Poppies Martinez
|TKO (spinning back-kick to the body and punches)
|Bellator 125
|
|align=center|1
|align=center|2:16
|Fresno, California, United States
|
|-
|Win
|align=center|29–0
|Josh Arocho
|TKO (elbows)
|Bellator 117
|
|align=center|2
|align=center|2:37
|Council Bluffs, Iowa, United States
|
|-
|Win
|align=center|28–0
|Nelson Junior
|Submission (rear-naked choke)
|Sparta MMA 9
|
|align=center|1
|align=center|0:57
|Itajaí, Santa Catarina, Brazil
|
|-
|Win
|align=center|27–0
|Maikon de Carvalho
|Decision (unanimous)
|Sparta MMA 8
|
|align=center|3
|align=center|5:00
|Balneário Camboriú, Santa Catarina, Brazil
|
|-
|Win
|align=center|26–0
|Dener dos Santos
|KO (cartwheel kick)
|Watch Out Combat Show 28
|
|align=center|1
|align=center|2:42
|Gramado, Rio Grande do Sul, Brazil
|
|-
|Win
|align=center|25–0
|Hamilton Ferreira
|TKO (punches)
|Watch Out Combat Show 26
|
|align=center|1
|align=center|1:50
|Itajaí, Santa Catarina, Brazil
|
|-
|Win
|align=center|24–0
|Renato Gabardi
|Submission (rear-naked choke)
|Island Fighting Championships 1
|
|align=center|2
|align=center|4:47
|Palhoça, Santa Catarina, Brazil
|
|-
|Win
|align=center|23–0
|Alex de Souza
|TKO (punches)
|Sparta MMA 5 - Encontro de Campeoes
|
|align=center|1
|align=center|0:36
|Balneário Camboriú, Santa Catarina, Brazil
|
|-
|Win
|align=center|22–0
|Kaique Silva
|Submission (arm-triangle choke)
|Nocaute Fight Champion
|
|align=center|2
|align=center|2:18
|Curitibanos, Santa Catarina, Brazil
|
|-
|Win
|align=center|21–0
|Danilo Santos
|TKO (head kick)
|BingoFight
|
|align=center|2
|align=center|2:11
|Blumenau, Santa Catarina, Brazil
|
|-
|Win
|align=center|20–0
|Mauricio Machado
|KO (flying knee)
|Sparta MMA 4 - Julio Cesar vs Bad Boy
|
|align=center|1
|align=center|0:37
|Itajaí, Santa Catarina, Brazil
|
|-
|Win
|align=center|19–0
|Tiago Esquilo
|TKO (punches)
|CTA Combat - MMA & Muay Thai
|
|align=center|1
|align=center|1:08
|Palmeira das Missões, Rio Grande do Sul, Brazil
|
|-
|Win
|align=center|18–0
|Kelvin Kuster
|TKO (punches)
|Sparta MMA 3 - Class
|
|align=center|2
|align=center|2:10
|Balneário Camboriú, Santa Catarina, Brazil
|
|-
|Win
|align=center|17–0
|Ramones Silva
|TKO (punches)
|Tavares Combat 5
|
|align=center|1
|align=center|2:47
|Jaguaruna, Santa Catarina, Brazil
|
|-
|Win
|align=center|16–0
|Rafael Bixão
|Submission (rear-naked choke)
|Tavares Combat 4
|
|align=center|1
|align=center|3:26
|Santa Catarina, Brazil
|
|-
|Win
|align=center|15–0
|Vitor Miranda
|KO (head kick)
|Tavares Combat 2
|
|align=center|1
|align=center|2:34
|Itajaí, Santa Catarina, Brazil
|
|-
|Win
|align=center|14–0
|Maicon Silva
|KO (flying knee)
|Sparta MMA - Sparta Qualify 1
|
|align=center|1
|align=center|3:14
|Itajaí, Santa Catarina, Brazil
|
|-
|Win
|align=center|13–0
|Joao Capoeira
|KO (punch)
|Corupa Fight Champion
|
|align=center|1
|align=center|3:37
|Corupá, Santa Catarina, Brazil
|
|-
|Win
|align=center|12–0
|Guilherme Nascimento
|Submission (armbar)
|Tavares Combat
|
|align=center|1
|align=center|N/A
|Palhoça, Santa Catarina, Brazil
|
|-
|Win
|align=center|11–0
|Guilherme Severo
|Decision (unanimous)
|Golden Fighters 4
|
|align=center|3
|align=center|5:00
|Novo Hamburgo, Rio Grande do Sul, Brazil
|
|-
|Win
|align=center|10–0
|Antonio Bezerra
|KO (flying knee)
|Soul Fight Night
|
|align=center|2
|align=center|3:11
|Pirabeiraba, Santa Catarina, Brazil
|
|-
|Win
|align=center|9–0
|Luiz André
|TKO (punches)
|Soul Fight Night
|
|align=center|1
|align=center|1:16
|Pirabeiraba, Santa Catarina, Brazil
|
|-
|Win
|align=center|8–0
|Gustavo Mendonca
|KO (flying knee)
|Connect Fight Night 2
|
|align=center|2
|align=center|1:16
|Biguaçu, Santa Catarina, Brazil
|
|-
|Win
|align=center|7–0
|Fernando Giacometti
|Submission (rear-naked choke)
|Energy Force
|
|align=center|1
|align=center|1:50
|Navegantes, Santa Catarina, Brazil
|
|-
|Win
|align=center|6–0
|Lucas Moraes
|TKO (elbows)
|Connect Fight Night
|
|align=center|3
|align=center|3:04
|Balneário Camboriú, Santa Catarina, Brazil
|
|-
|Win
|align=center|5–0
|Jonathan Giocomossi
|Submission (arm-triangle choke)
|Blufight MMA - Blufight 2
|
|align=center|1
|align=center|3:10
|Blumenau, Santa Catarina, Brazil
|
|-
|Win
|align=center|4–0
|Apostolis Andrade Halianis
|Decision (unanimous)
|Nitrix Champion Fight 10
|
|align=center|3
|align=center|5:00
|Camboriu, Santa Catarina, Brazil
|
|-
|Win
|align=center|3–0
|Renato Monaco
|Submission (rear-naked choke)
|Blufight MMA - Blufight 1
|
|align=center|1
|align=center|1:57
|Blumenau, Santa Catarina, Brazil
|
|-
|Win
|align=center|2–0
|Fabio Japones
|KO (flying knee)
|FPMMA - Combat
|
|align=center|1
|align=center|2:17
|São Caetano do Sul, São Paulo, Brazil
|
|-
|Win
|align=center|1–0
|Maicon Gregor
|KO (flying knee)
|Octagon MMA
|
|align=center|1
|align=center|4:12
|Itajaí, Santa Catarina, Brazil
|
|-

References

1994 births
Living people
Brazilian male mixed martial artists
Featherweight mixed martial artists
Mixed martial artists utilizing Muay Thai
Mixed martial artists utilizing Luta Livre
Brazilian Muay Thai practitioners